Achchelu is a small town in Sri Lanka. It is located within Northern Province. Achchu (in Tamil அச்சு) means middle, Elu (in Tamil ஏழு) means Seven. Because,  this town is located middle of the seven villages in Jaffna.

See also
List of towns in Northern Province, Sri Lanka

External links

Populated places in Northern Province, Sri Lanka